Neville Tatum (born 21 July 1965) is a former speedway rider from England.

Speedway career 
Tatum reached the final of the British Speedway Championship in 1997. He rode in the top tier of British Speedway from 1984 to 2003, riding for various clubs.

Family
His brother is Kelvin Tatum.

He is married to Elke Tatum and they have two children, Hannah and Phillip. Hannah studies at Kings College London.

References 

Living people
1965 births
British speedway riders
Canterbury Crusaders riders
Coventry Bees riders
Eastbourne Eagles riders
Ipswich Witches riders
Isle of Wight Islanders riders
Lakeside Hammers riders
Oxford Cheetahs riders
Peterborough Panthers riders
Somerset Rebels riders
Stoke Potters riders
Wimbledon Dons riders